A motion of no confidence in the French government of Élisabeth Borne was tabled by the left-wing NUPES coalition on 11 July 2022.

The motion was rejected: it received only 146 yes votes out of the 289 needed.

Background

2022 French legislative election
The presidential majority of Emmanuel Macron failed to gain an absolute majority of seats in the 2022 French legislative election on June 19. It was described as a setback for the ruling Ensemble Citoyens coalition and the government of Élisabeth Borne.

According to French MP Bastien Lachaud, the no-confidence motion ″will clarify things. It concerns the method of refusing to ask for confidence. Any member of Parliament who is aware today that this is a denial of democracy can vote for this motion″.

Result
The no-confidence motion received 146 yes votes out of the 289 needed.

Vote

See also 

 October 2022 votes of no confidence in the government of Élisabeth Borne

References

2022 in Paris
2022 in French politics
July 2022 events in France
Votes of no confidence in France
Emmanuel Macron